was a Japanese mathematician specializing in algebra who attended University of Tokyo in Japan. Morishima published at least thirteen papers, including his work on Fermat's Last Theorem. and a collected works volume published in 1990 after his death. He also corresponded several times with American mathematician H. S. Vandiver.

Morishima's Theorem on FLT 

Let m be a prime number not exceeding 31. Let p be prime, and let x, y, z be integers such that xp + yp + zp = 0. Assume that p does not divide the product xyz. Then, p² must  divide  mp − 1-1.

Review
Granville wrote that Morishima's proof could not be accepted.

References

External links
Collected papers at Queen's University

1903 births
1989 deaths
20th-century Japanese mathematicians
Algebraists